Abigail Latu-Meafou (born 5 July 1997) is a New Zealand-born Australian netball player in the ANZ Premiership, playing for the Waikato Bay of Plenty Magic. 

Latu-Meafou was born in Auckland, New Zealand though grew up playing netball in Ipswich, Australia. She made her debut in the Super Netball league in 2017 for the Queensland Firebirds as an injury-replacement player before being picked up on the starting list by the Adelaide Thunderbirds ahead of the 2018 season. Latu-Meafou stayed at the Thunderbirds until the end of the 2018 season, and then moved to New Zealand to play for the Waikato Bay of Plenty Magic.

References

1997 births
Australian netball players
Adelaide Thunderbirds players
Waikato Bay of Plenty Magic players
Living people
Netball players from Auckland
ANZ Premiership players
Suncorp Super Netball players
Australian Netball League players
Southern Force (netball) players
Netball players from Queensland
New Zealand netball players
Queensland Fusion players
Queensland state netball league players